Ina Ka ng Anak Mo is a 1979 Filipino film directed by Lino Brocka and starring Nora Aunor. The film was an official entry to the 1979 Metro Manila Film Festival, and garnered several awards including Best Actor for Raoul Aragonn and a tie for Best Actress between Lolita Rodriguez and Nora Aunor. It also garnered several nominations in the following year's FAMAS and Gawad Urian. Despite its adult theme and rating, the film was successful at the box office during its commercial run. The story portrays the everyday life of the deeply religious Renata (Lolita Rodriguez) and her daughter Ester (Nora Aunor), who is married to Luis (Raoul Aragonn).

This is Nora's first movie under the direction of Lino Brocka and an entry to the 1979 Metro Manila Film Festival.

Synopsis
This is a story of day-to-day living by Renata (Lolita Rodriguez), her daughter Esther (Nora Aunor) and Esther's husband Luis (Raul Aragon). Ester and Luis are a couple trying to start their own family while living in Renata's house.

Cast
Nora Aunor as Esther
Lolita Rodriguez as Renata
Raul Aragon as Luis
Lorli Villanueva as The Lawyer
Carlito Bonoy Gonzaga as Tirso
Crisanta Cruz as Alma

Awards

References

External links
 

Filipino-language films
Philippine drama films
1979 films
1979 drama films
Films about Filipino families
Films directed by Lino Brocka